Sissu (also known as Khwaling) is a small town in the Lahaul valley of Himachal Pradesh in India. It is around 40 km from Manali and located on the right bank of Chandra river. It is 3,120 m (10,235 ft) above sea level. It is 14 km (9 miles) from Koksar to the south-east and 11 km. (7 miles) west to Gondhla.

Overview
It has a PWD Rest House, a High School and Primary Health Centre. There are a few 'chai shops' or tea stalls. 

The view of the waterfall across the Chandra river and opposite the town, locally known as 'Palden Lhamo dhar', is particularly spectacular. The adjacent village of Shashin is home of the famous deity of Lahaul known as Ghepan/Ghepang or Lord Gyephang. The mountain, Gyephang Goh, altitude 5,870 m. (19,258 ft.), to the east of the town is named after him. Sissu also has a Helipad and an adjacent Lake , which is a major tourist attraction.
    

Sissu is the main town centre for the nearby villages of Ropsang-Khangser-Gyungling, Gomathang, Yangling, Jagdang, Sarkhang, Shurthang and Labrang.  Labrang village also has a Buddhist Gompa called Labrang Gompa dedicated to Palden Lhamo.  As Sissu is located a few kilometres from the north portal of the Rohtang Tunnel, this area will stay connected for the whole year.  Hence, it will become a popular tourist destination in upcoming years.  The area is beautiful and has facilities for tourist to stay here.  Hotels of Sissu are Hotel Triveni, Hotel Plm dhara, a few Home stays and Goldrop Luxury Camps which gives the chilly feel of the area in summers.

Transport

Air 
Bhuntar (IATA code KUU), the nearest airport is located in Bhuntar town, on NH3. From there, Sissu is approximately 80 Kms(50 mi) which can be covered via a 2.5 hour long drive through NH3 that passes via Atal Tunnel and leaves Rohtang at a distance of approximately 2.4 Km.

Road 
From Delhi, take NH1 up to Ambala, then NH 22 to Chandigarh, and then NH 21 to Bilaspur, Sundernagar, Mandi, and Kullu. The distance between Chandigarh and Manali by road is 310 km (193 mi), with a total distance of 570 km (354 mi) between Delhi and Manali. Sissu from Manali is approximately 40 km (25 mi) which takes around 1.5 hours via NH3 that passes through Atal tunnel.

See also
Leh–Manali Highway

References

Cities and towns in Lahaul and Spiti district